Color a Dinosaur is a 1993 electronic coloring book video game for young children.  It was developed by FarSight Studios for the Nintendo Entertainment System.

Gameplay

The player colors various dinosaurs by using the provided dinosaur images and palettes. Players can either color using the free form mode or in the automatic mode where they only choose a color.

Intended for ages 3 to 6, the game lacks sophisticated features such as animation and minigames, and the basic colors are either brightly colored patterns or limited variations on pink or red. An extra set of patterns can be reached by pressing the Select button.

Reception
The September 1997 issue of Nintendo Power presented the votes of twelve staff members, to list their top 100 games of all time. This list also includes a 10 worst games of all time, placing Color a Dinosaur at 9th. The article described the game as Mario Paint "without anything fun in it" and that "even the producer of the game (Seth, wherever you are) would roll his eyes when reminded of this prehistoric patsy."

Rarity
Color a Dinosaur is recorded as being one of the rarest licensed NES games, as described in the 2015 documentary Nintendo Quest starring Jay Bartlett.

References

1993 video games
Dinosaurs in video games
Drawing video games
FarSight Studios games
North America-exclusive video games
Nintendo Entertainment System games
Nintendo Entertainment System-only games
Single-player video games
Video games scored by Tommy Tallarico
Video games developed in the United States
Children's educational video games